Lithornis is a genus of extinct paleognathous birds. Although Lithornis was able to fly well, their closest relatives are the extant tinamous (which are poor flyers) and ratites (which are flightless birds).

Fossils of Lithornis are known with certainty from the Upper Paleocene through the Middle Eocene, but their fossil record may extend to the late Cretaceous. Lithornis is from ancient Greek for 'stone bird', as it is one of the first fossil birds to become widely discussed. Presumably closely related genera are Paracathartes and Pseudocrypturus.

Species

Six species have been recognized in modern times; undescribed ones are also likely to exist. The supposed tarsometatarsus piece from which "Lithornis" emuinus was described is actually a humerus fragment of the giant pseudotooth bird Dasornis.

Lithornis celetius
L. celetius is from the Bangtail Quarry, Sedan Quadrangle, Park County, Montana, and was described by Peter Houde (1988). It is from the Fort Union Formation, which is earliest Tiffanian, Late Paleocene. The type fossil is USNM 290601.

L. celetius was of average size for the genus, and the name Celetius is derived from the Greek word keletion a race horse for which the type locality is also named.

Lithornis hookeri
Harrison and Walker originally labeled the fossil as belonging to the species Pediorallus barbarae in 1977. In 1984, Harrison redescribed the fossil as coming from a new species Pediorallus hookeri, and later that year it was moved to Lithornis hookeri.  L. hookeri is the smallest of the Lithornithidae.

Lithornis nasi
W. George collected the original fossil in the Division A London Clay, North Sea Basin at Walton on the Naze, Essex, England.  The fossil was described by Harrison in 1984 as a rail, Pediorallus nasi, but was later moved to Lithornis nasi.  L. nasi is larger than L. hookeri and L. plebius.

Lithornis plebius
L. plebius is from the same locality as L. promiscuus and was also described by Peter Houde (1988). The type specimen is USNM 336534.

Lithornis promiscuus
L. promiscuus has type specimen USNM 336535 and was described by Peter Houde (1988). It is from the Clark Quadrangle, Park County, Wyoming, USA. It is from the Willwood Formation, which is earliest Eocene in age. An egg, USNM 336570, is known for L. celetius as well.

Lithornis vulturinus
L. vulturinus was described as a vulture by Owen (1840) from the holotype fossil 955 738 - TM 024 717. The fossil was collected from Early Eocene London Clay deposits on the Isle of Sheppey, Kent, England by J. Hunter before 1793. This fossil was destroyed by bombing in World War II. Numerous isolated fossil bones of Lithornis vulturinus were incorrectly described anew, such as Parvigyps praecox and Promusophaga magnifica - the supposed earliest vulture and turaco, while others were referred to existing families of neognathous birds. A neotype (BMNH A 5204) was erected to replace the holotype in 1988 by Houde, who for the first time diagnosed it as a paleognath based on complete three-dimensional skulls and skeletons of congeners from North America.  An exceptionally preserved specimen was collected from Denmark and cataloged as MGUH 26770.

Palaeobiology
Lithornis wing bones are similar to those of storks and vultures, meaning that unlike modern tinamous it was capable of soaring flight.Gerald Mayr, The Birds from the Paleocene Fissure Filling of Walbeck (Germany), Journal of Vertebrate Paleontology 27(2):394–408, June 2007: https://ichthyoconodon.files.wordpress.com/2018/11/flight.png

In a study about ratite endocasts, Lithornis ranks among the taxa with well developed olfactory lobes. This is consistent with a nocturnal, forest-dwelling lifestyle, though as much all volant birds it retains large optical lobes.

Unlike modern tinamous, Lithornis has toe claws and reversed halluxes that allow for efficient perching.

Several egg fossils have been attributed to Lithornis.Houde, Peter W. (1988). "Paleognathous Birds from the Early Tertiary of the Northern Hemisphere". Publications of the Nuttall Ornithological Club (Cambridge, MA) 22. Their eggshells are, perhaps unsurprisingly, noted as being "ratite-like".

ReferencesFootnotesSources'
 
 
 
 

Fossil taxa described in 1840
Lithornithidae
Paleocene birds
Eocene birds of Europe
Paleogene birds of Europe
Bartonian extinctions
Paleogene birds of North America